Fuxing District (Atayal: Pyasan), formerly known as Fuxing Township or Fu-Hsing Township is a mountain indigenous district in eastern Taoyuan City, Taiwan. The main population is the Atayal people of the Taiwanese aborigines. Lalashan (拉拉山) is a major feature of Fuxing, and the Shimen Reservoir, formed by Shimen Dam, is a popular nearby site. Fuxing District is, by area, the largest district in Taoyuan City.

History
Under Japanese rule, Fuxing District was classified as Aboriginal Land (蕃地).

In August 2015, the Heliu community in the district were completely buried by landslide triggered by Typhoon Soudelor.

Geography
 Area: 350.78 km2 (135.4 sq mi)
 Population: 13,088 people (February 2023)

Administrative divisions
Gaoyi, Hualing, Kuihui, Luofu, Sanguang, Sanmin, Xiayun, Yicheng, Zeren and Zhangxing Village.

Mountains over 1500 metres

 Najieshan 那結山, 1,520 m (4,987 ft)
 Mawangzenglüshan 馬望曾呂山, 1,577 m (5,174 ft)
 Niaozuishan 鳥嘴山, 1,749 m (5,738 ft)
 Xingjianshan 興尖山, 1,852 m (6,076 ft)
 Fufushan 夫婦山, 1,870 m (6,135 ft)
 Meiguiximoshan 玫瑰西魔山, 1,871 m (6,138 ft)
 Lengshan 稜山, 1,889 m (6,198 ft)
 Lupeishan 魯培山, 1,905 m (6,250 ft)
 Nanchatianshan 南插天山, 1,907 m (6,257 ft)
 Lidongshan 李棟山, 1,914 m (6,280 ft)
 Lalashan 拉拉山, 2,030 m (6,660 ft)
 Tangsuishan 唐穗山, 2,090 m (6,280 ft)
 Babokulushan 巴博庫魯山, 2,101 m (6,893 ft)
 Tamanshan 塔曼山, 2,130 m (6,988 ft)
 Dilushan 低陸山, 2,160 m (7,087 ft)
 Yufengshan 玉峰山, 2,300 m (7,546 ft)
 Xiqiusishan 西丘斯山, 2,427 m (7,963 ft)
 Baideshan 白的山, 2,444 m (8,018 ft)

Northern Cross-Island Highway Hiking Trails
12.1 km (7.5 mi) > Sanmin Bat Cave...
16.3 km (10.1 mi) > Jiaobanshan, Jinpingshan...
17.7 km (11 mi) > Dongyanshan, Zhijishan...
20.7 km (12.9 mi) > Xiao Wulai > Hewei Ancient Trees, Beichatianshan, Nanchatianshan, Lupaishan, Daishifushan...
22.7 km (14.1 mi) > Luofu > Roma Rd.
28.2 km (17.5 mi) > Dawan > Najieshan...
31.1 km (19.3 mi) > Xuewu Tunnel > Fufushan...
39.9 km (24.8 mi) > Gaoyi > Yingshan...
46.5 km (28.9 mi) > Baling Bridge.
47.4 km (29.5 mi) > Galahe > Xuebaishan, Tangsuishan, Dilushan, Yufengshan, Siqiusishan...
47.8 km (29.7 mi) > Shang Baling > Lalashan Ancient Trees, Tamanshan, Meiguiximoshan, Baling-Fushan Trail...
59.3 km (36.8 mi)> Jianshan...
61.5 km (38.2 mi) > Lengshan
67.0 km (41.6 mi) > Mingchi > Babokulushan...

River Tracing
 Yunei River
 Xibuqiao River
 Sanguang River
 Taman River

Tourist attractions
 Baleng Tower
 
 Dongyanshan Forest Recreation Area
 Jiaobanshan Sculpture Park
 Jiguopai Old Church
 Junghua Dam
 Lalashan Forest Reserve
 Luofu Bridge
 Sanmin Bat Cave
 Xiao Wulai Waterfall
 Xikou Suspension Bridge

Transportation
Zhongli Bus Co.
 Taoyuan Station 桃園 06:30 – Linbankou 林班口開 09:30
 Taoyuan Station 桃園 12:30 - Linbankou 林班口開 15:30

Taoyuan Bus Co.
 Taoyuan Station 桃園 06:50 - Linbankou 林班口開 09:50
 Zhongli Station 中壢 10:30 - Linbankou 林班口開 13:30

See also
 Taoyuan City

References

External links
 
  
 Fu-Hsing Township Tourism Guide

Districts of Taoyuan City